Kenneth Andrew Walsh is a Canadian biochemist who has spent most of his career in the United States and is now professor emeritus of biochemistry at the University of Washington.

Education 
Walsh  received his Ph.D. from the University of Toronto, and became a Postdoctoral Fellow of Dr. Hans Neurath at the University of Washington in the early 1960s.

Career 
Walsh joined the faculty at the University of Washington and in 1992, he became Department chairperson.

Walsh's research on protein chemistry was recognized with the 2002 Pehr Edman Award. The award citation states that:

Walsh has published 58 papers.

References

Living people
University of Washington faculty
Canadian biochemists
University of Toronto alumni
Year of birth missing (living people)